Looking for the Perfect Beat: 1980–1985 is a compilation album by hip hop musician Afrika Bambaataa.

Release
Looking for the Perfect Beat: 1980–1985 was released on March 20, 2001 on compact disc and a limited two disc vinyl set. The release was part of the label Tommy Boy Records' celebration of twenty years in the music industry.

Reception

From contemporary reviews, John Duffy of AllMusic gave the album a five star out of five star rating, noting that Bambaataa's "considerable influence has largely been brushed aside by a rap world that sadly ignores far too many of its innovators" as well as "nicely augments the resume of producer Arthur Baker, a trailblazing dance remixer of the early '80s." Duffy main complaint with the compilation was the lack of any significant liner notes or photographs. The compilation included Bambaataa's "finest moments, including the classic "Planet Rock" alongside timeless siblings "Jazzy Sensation", "Looking For The Perfect Beat" and "Unity" with James Brown." and that the compilation "represents an integral part of hip-hop history and is an essential purchase for any serious fan of Black music." Jon Caramanica of Rolling Stone gave a positive review as well, noting that the "collection ably captures [Bambaataa's] dance-floor magnetism " and specifically praised tracks "Zulu Nation Throwdown", "Looking for the Perfect Beat" and "Renegades of Funk". Robert Christgau praised the collection stating it contained "at the irreducible least are two of the greatest records of the '80" and noted that the tracks that range from competent to classic.

Track listing
Track listing adapted from back of vinyl sleeve.

Personnel
Credits are from the Looking For the Perfect Beat sleeve.
 Ninny – producer (on tracks 1)
 Kenny Donovan – arrangements (on track 1), producer (on track 2)
 James Nichols – mixing (on track 1)
 Tom Silverman – executive producer (on tracks 3 and 4), edits (on track 8), producer (on track 9), mixing (on track 11)
 Arthur Baker – producer (on tracks 3, 4, 5, 6, 7 and 8), mixing (on tracks 4, 5, 6 and 7), arrangements (on track 6, 7 and 8), executive producer (on track 8)
 Shep Pettibone – mixing and arrangements (on tracks 3)
 Jay Burnett – engineer (on tracks 3 and 4)
 Bob Rosa – engineer (on tracks 4 and 9)
 Planet Patrol – music (on tracks 4)
 John Robie – producer and mixing (on tracks 5, 6, 7) and arrangements (on tracks 6, 7)
 Harry Belafonte – executive producer (on track 8)
 Afrika Bambaataa –  producer (on tracks 9, 10)
 The Fats Comet Crew (Keith LeBlanc, Doug Wimbish and Skip McDonald) – producer (on track 9, 10)
 The Fats Comet Production (Keith LeBlanc, Doug Wimbish and Skip McDonald) – producer (on track 11)
 Keith LeBlanc – engineer (on track 11)
 Eric Calvi – engineer (on track 11)

References

Sources
 
 
 

Afrika Bambaataa albums
2001 compilation albums
Albums produced by Arthur Baker (musician)
Hip hop compilation albums
Tommy Boy Records compilation albums